Ted Gibson is a celebrity hairdresser with a salon in New York City. He is the hair expert on the cable show What Not to Wear. Notable clients include Anne Hathaway, Renée Zellweger, Kate Gosselin, Zoe Saldana, Ashley Greene and the fashion houses Chanel and Prada.

Notes

External links

About Ted Gibson

American hairdressers
American television personalities
African-American television personalities
Living people
Year of birth missing (living people)
21st-century African-American people